Andrzej Fedorowicz may refer to:

 Andrzej Fedorowicz (politician) (born 1950), Polish politician
 Andrzej Fedorowicz (actor) (born 1942), Polish actor